Leo Mandelkern (23 February 1922 – 31 May 2006) was a polymer chemist and professor known for his contributions to the understanding of polymer crystallization, and for his contributions to education.

Personal 

Mandelkern was born on February 23, 1922, in New York City.  He was raised there, and attended public schools.  He served as a meteorologist during World War II.  He died on May 31, 2006.

Education 

 1942 A.B., Chemistry, Cornell University
 1949 Ph.D., Chemistry, Cornell University, supervised by Frank Long

Career 

 1949 - 1952 Research Associate, Cornell University, supervised by Paul Flory 
 1952 - 1962 Physical Chemist, National Bureau of Standards
 1962 - 2006 Professor of Chemistry, Florida State University
 1970 - 1974 Associate Director, Institute of Molecular Biophysics, Florida State University

Awards and recognition

 1957	Medal Award for Meritorious Service, United States Department of Commerce, National Bureau of Standards
 1958	Arthur S. Fleming Award, Washington DC Junior Chamber of Commerce
 1975	Witco Award in Polymer Chemistry, American Chemical Society
 1984	Florida Award, American Chemical Society, Lakeland, Florida
 1984	Mettler Award, North American Thermal Analysis Society
 1993 - Charles Goodyear Medal from the ACS Rubber Division
 1994 - Paul J. Flory Polymer Education Award

References 

Polymer scientists and engineers
1922 births
2006 deaths
Cornell University alumni